Starkman is a surname. Notable people with the surname include:

David Starkman (1885– 1947), Austrian-American silent film businessman
Haim Starkman (born 1944), Israeli basketball player
Maxwell Starkman (1921–2003), Canadian-American architect
Randy Starkman (1960–2012), Canadian sports journalist